Baroud is a 1932 British-French adventure film directed by Rex Ingram and Alice Terry and starring Felipe Montes, Rosita Garcia, and Pierre Batcheff. Actor Paul Henreid debuted in a small role. The film was released in separate French and English-language versions, the latter sometimes known by the title Love in Morocco.

It was the final film of Ingram, a leading Hollywood director of the silent era, and the last film appearance by Alice Terry, a leading Hollywood star of the silent era and Ingram's wife. The title is the Berber word for war.

Plot
It is set in French Morocco. Two soldiers in the Spahis, one a Frenchman and the other the son of a chief allied to the French, are friends, but quarrel when the Frenchman becomes romantically involved with the other's sister. They join forces again to repulse an attack by a hostile tribe.

Cast

English version
 Felipe Montes as Si Alal, Caid de Ilued  
 Rosita Garcia as Zinah, his daughter  
 Pierre Batcheff as Si Hamed  
 Rex Ingram as André Duval  
 Arabella Fields as Mabrouka, a slave  
 Andrews Engelmann as Si Amarok  
 Dennis Hoey as Captain Sabry  
 Laura Salerni as Arlette 
 Frédéric Mariotti 
 Alice Terry 
 Paul Henreid (film debut in a bit part)

French version
 Philippe Moretti as Si Allal, Caïd d'IIllouet  
 Rosita Garcia  as Zinah, la fille de Si Allal  
 Pierre Batcheff as Si Hamed, le fils de Si Allal, Maréchal des Logis de Spahis  
 Roland Caillaux as André Duval, Sergent de Spahis  
 Arabella Fields as Mabrouka  
 Andrews Engelmann as Si Amarock, Chef de tribu rebelle  
 Georges Busby as Lakhdar  
 Richard Gaillard as Capitaine Labry  
 Colette Darfeuil as Arlette

References

Bibliography
 Cook, Pam. Gainsborough Pictures. Cassell, 1997.

External links
 
 

1932 films
1930s war adventure films
1930s French-language films
British war adventure films
French war adventure films
Films directed by Rex Ingram
Films set in Morocco
Films shot in Morocco
Gainsborough Pictures films
Gaumont Film Company films
French multilingual films
Films scored by Jack Beaver
British multilingual films
1932 multilingual films
Films shot at Imperial Studios, Elstree
1930s English-language films
1930s British films
1930s French films